is a Japanese heavy metal band formed in 2013 by Eizo Sakamoto and She-Ja.

History 
Aisenshi serves as a spiritual successor to Sakamoto's previous project Animetal. Sakamoto claims that the spirit of what "Animetal" comprised has not died, but has since become more soulful and sorrowful, with the anime theme song covers they will perform now having such a tone to them. In an interview with Beeast, Sakamoto said that he had decided to reform Animetal with She-ja after the popularity of Animetal USA and after he had enjoyed performing on his solo project Eizo Japan, both in Japan and internationally. One of their first reunion concerts on June 29, 2013, at Osaka's Shinsaibashi Club Alive was met with praise, with the group performing both new tracks off of their album Heartstrings, released on June 5, 2013, as well as songs from their old Animetal repertoire and an original song , that the band released as a single on December 10, 2013.

The band's members, aside from Sakamoto on vocals and She-Ja on guitar, include Gusty Bombs' bassist Hiro, Animetal's former drummer Katsuji, and Juhki from the dōjin music circle "IRON ATTACK!".

Personnel
 – lead vocals
 – lead guitar
Hiro – bass
Katsuji – drums

Discography

Albums

Singles

Videos

References

External links

Japanese heavy metal musical groups
Anime musical groups